Davis Gaines (born January 21, 1954, Orlando, Florida) is an American stage actor.

He has performed as the Phantom in the Andrew Lloyd Webber musical The Phantom of the Opera over 2,000 times, on Broadway, on tour, in Los Angeles, and in San Francisco. In the last location, he won the Bay Area Critics' Award for Best Actor. He performed in the role for the Kennedy Center Honors in 1994. He originated the lead role of The Man in Whistle Down the Wind (1996).

Gaines was also the singing voice of Chamberlain in The Swan Princess (1994). He guested in "Murder in White", a 1993 episode of Murder, She Wrote. He was also a musical guest star for Broadway on Ice, a touring ice show with live music. Davis also played the role of Anthony Hope in Sondheim's Sweeney Todd: The Demon Barber of Fleet Street in concert, alongside George Hearn and Patti LuPone.

One of his first jobs was as a costumed character at Walt Disney World theme park; as a high school student, he played Pinocchio character J. Worthington Foulfellow.  Gaines commonly performs the national anthem(s) prior to Los Angeles Kings games at Staples Center.

In February 2012, Gaines assumed the role of Don Quixote in Man of La Mancha at Musical Theatre West in Long Beach, California.

On February 21, 2013, Gaines performed "The Music of the Night" (from The Phantom of the Opera) at the memorial service at Nokia Theatre in Los Angeles for Los Angeles Lakers owner Jerry Buss.

In 2014, Gaines performed at the Orlando Shakespeare Theater in Les Misérables as Javert.

In 2015, Gaines performed at the Orlando Shakespeare Theater in Spamalot as King Arthur.

In 2016, Gaines performed at the La Mirada Theatre in Lend Me a Tenor as Tito Merelli.

In 2017, Gaines reassumed his role of Don Quixote at the Orlando Shakespeare Theater in Man of La Mancha.

In 2022, Gaines performed at the Orlando Shakespeare Theater in The Fantasticks as El Gallo.

Awards and nominations
Ovation Awards
2012: Won the award for Lead Actor in a Musical for his role as Cervantes/Quixote in the Musical Theatre West production of Man of La Mancha

References

External links
 
 
 Older official profile text
 

1959 births
Living people
American male stage actors
American male musical theatre actors
American operatic tenors
Male actors from Orlando, Florida
Edgewater High School alumni
Singers from Florida
Classical musicians from Florida